Johs. (Johannes) Haugerud (26 October 1896 in Grünerløkka – 21 February 1971) was a Norwegian politician for the Conservative Party.

He served as mayor of Bærum from 1959 to 1967. Outside politics he worked as an engineer.

References
Norwegian Wikipedia

1896 births
1971 deaths
Conservative Party (Norway) politicians
Mayors of places in Akershus
Bærum politicians